A Farmhouse Christmas is the first Christmas album by American country music duo Joey + Rory. It was released on October 11, 2011 via Vanguard Records and Sugar Hill Records. The album contains twelve tracks, ten of which are either new or not traditionally associated with Christmas. It includes the standards "Away in a Manger" and "Blue Christmas," as well as a cover of Merle Haggard's "If We Make It Through December" featuring background vocals from Haggard.

Track listing

Chart performance

References

2011 Christmas albums
Christmas albums by American artists
Country Christmas albums
Joey + Rory albums
Sugar Hill Records albums
Vanguard Records albums